The Canton of Poix-de-Picardie is a canton situated in the department of the Somme and in the Hauts-de-France region of northern France.

Geography 
The canton is organised around the commune of Poix-de-Picardie.

Composition
At the French canton reorganisation which came into effect in March 2015, the canton was expanded from 28 to 79 communes:

Andainville
Arguel
Aumâtre
Aumont
Avesnes-Chaussoy
Beaucamps-le-Jeune
Beaucamps-le-Vieux
Belloy-Saint-Léonard
Bergicourt
Bermesnil
Bettembos
Blangy-sous-Poix
Brocourt
Bussy-lès-Poix
Cannessières
Caulières
Cerisy-Buleux
Courcelles-sous-Moyencourt
Croixrault
Dromesnil
Épaumesnil
Éplessier
Équennes-Éramecourt
Étréjust
Famechon
Fontaine-le-Sec
Forceville-en-Vimeu
Foucaucourt-Hors-Nesle
Fourcigny
Framicourt
Fresnes-Tilloloy
Fresneville
Fresnoy-Andainville
Frettecuisse
Fricamps
Gauville
Guizancourt
Hescamps
Heucourt-Croquoison
Hornoy-le-Bourg
Inval-Boiron
Lachapelle
Lafresguimont-Saint-Martin
Lamaronde
Lignières-Châtelain
Lignières-en-Vimeu
Liomer
Marlers
Le Mazis
Meigneux
Méréaucourt
Méricourt-en-Vimeu
Morvillers-Saint-Saturnin
Mouflières
Moyencourt-lès-Poix
Nesle-l'Hôpital
Neslette
Neuville-au-Bois
Neuville-Coppegueule
Offignies
Oisemont
Poix-de-Picardie
Le Quesne
Rambures
Saint-Aubin-Rivière
Sainte-Segrée
Saint-Germain-sur-Bresle
Saint-Léger-sur-Bresle
Saint-Maulvis
Saulchoy-sous-Poix
Senarpont
Thieulloy-l'Abbaye
Thieulloy-la-Ville 
Le Translay
Vergies
Villeroy
Villers-Campsart
Vraignes-lès-Hornoy
Woirel

Population

See also
 Somme
 Arrondissements of the Somme department
 Cantons of the Somme department
 Communes of the Somme department

References

Poix-de-Picardie